Rabi Elia (born 19 April 1987) is a Swedish footballer of Assyrian descent who plays for Syrianska FC as a defender.

References

External links

1987 births
Living people
Swedish footballers
Association football defenders
Swedish people of Syrian descent
Assyrian footballers
Syrianska FC players
Allsvenskan players
Superettan players
AFC Eskilstuna players